Sohal Jagir is a village in Shahkot. Shahkot is a city in the district Jalandhar of Indian state of Punjab.

About 
Shahkot lies on the Pandori-Kharas road which is almost 1 km from it.  
The nearest railway station to Sohal Jagir is Shahkot railway station at a distance of 6 km.

Post code 
Sohal Jagir's Post code is 144703.

website 
https://www.sohaljagir.com/

References

External Links 

 Official website of Punjab Govt. with Sohal Jagir's details

Villages in Jalandhar district